Poland competed at the 2010 European Athletics Championships in Barcelona, Spain, from 27 July - 1 August 2010. A delegation of 71 athletes were sent to represent the country.

Medals

References

Nations at the 2010 European Athletics Championships
2010
European Athletics Championships